Amselina is a genus of small moths in the family Autostichidae (subfamily Symmocinae).

Species
Amselina adornata Gozmány, 2008
Amselina africana Gozmány, 2008
Amselina amaura Gozmány, 2008
Amselina aspergata Gozmány, 2008
Amselina cedestiella (Zeller, 1868)
Amselina effendi (Gozmány, 1963)
Amselina emir (Gozmány, 1961)
Amselina eremita (Gozmány, 1963)
Amselina kasyi (Gozmány, 1961)
Amselina manisadjiani Gozmány, 2008
Amselina minorita Gozmany, 1968
Amselina monorita (Gozmány, 1969)
Amselina odynera Gozmány, 2008
Amselina olympi Gozmány, 1957
Amselina parapsesta Gozmány, 1986
Amselina stagonophora Gozmány, 2008
Amselina virgo (Gozmány, 1959)
Amselina wiltshirei (Gozmány, 1963)

References

 
Symmocinae